Entomacrodus is a genus of combtooth blennies.

Species
There are currently 27 recognized species in this genus:
 Entomacrodus cadenati V. G. Springer, 1967 (West African rockhopper)
 Entomacrodus caudofasciatus (Regan, 1909) (Tail-barred rockskipper)
 Entomacrodus chapmani V. G. Springer, 1967 (Chapman's blenny)
 Entomacrodus chiostictus (D. S. Jordan & C. H. Gilbert, 1882) (Rock blenny)
 Entomacrodus corneliae (Fowler, 1932)
 Entomacrodus cymatobiotus L. P. Schultz & W. M. Chapman, 1960 (Pacific rockskipper)
 Entomacrodus decussatus (Bleeker, 1858) (Wavy-lined blenny)
 Entomacrodus epalzeocheilos (Bleeker, 1859) (Fringelip rockskipper)
 Entomacrodus lemuria V. G. Springer & R. Fricke, 2000
 Entomacrodus lighti (Herre, 1938)
 Entomacrodus longicirrus V. G. Springer, 1967
 Entomacrodus macrospilus V. G. Springer, 1967
 Entomacrodus marmoratus (E. T. Bennett, 1828) (Rockskipper)
 Entomacrodus nigricans T. N. Gill, 1859 (Pearl blenny)
 Entomacrodus niuafoouensis (Fowler, 1932) (Tattoo-chin rockskipper)
 Entomacrodus randalli V. G. Springer, 1967
 Entomacrodus rofeni V. G. Springer, 1967
 Entomacrodus sealei Bryan & Herre, 1903 (Seale's rockskipper)
 Entomacrodus solus J. T. Williams & Bogorodsky, 2010
 Entomacrodus stellifer (D. S. Jordan & Snyder, 1902) (Stellar rockskipper)
 Entomacrodus strasburgi V. G. Springer, 1967 (Strasburg's blenny)
 Entomacrodus striatus (Valenciennes, 1836) (Reef margin blenny)
 Entomacrodus textilis (Valenciennes, 1836) (Textile blenny)
 Entomacrodus thalassinus (D. S. Jordan & Seale, 1906) (Sea blenny)
 Entomacrodus vermiculatus (Valenciennes, 1836) (Vermiculated blenny)
 Entomacrodus vomerinus (Valenciennes, 1836)
 Entomacrodus williamsi V. G. Springer & R. Fricke, 2000

References 

 
Salarinae
Marine fish genera
Taxa named by Theodore Gill
Taxonomy articles created by Polbot